Gary Adrian Condit (born April 21, 1948) is an American former politician who represented California's 18th congressional district in the House of Representatives from 1989 to 2003. He gained significant national attention for an extramarital affair with Chandra Levy, an intern with the Federal Bureau of Prisons. The affair was publicized after Levy's disappearance in May 2001 and the discovery of Levy's remains a year later.

Although Condit was never formally a suspect in Levy's disappearance and murder, he lost the 2002 Democratic primary based in large part on negative publicity from the scandal.

Early life
Gary Condit was born in Salina, Oklahoma, on April 21, 1948, the son of Velma Jean (Tidwell) Condit (1929–2017) and Adrian Burl Condit (1927-2021), a Baptist minister. He was raised and educated in Oklahoma, and graduated from Tulsa's Nathan Hale High School. During the summers of his high school years, Condit worked as a roustabout in Oklahoma's oil fields. In 1967, at age 18, he married his high school sweetheart Carolyn Berry. An investigation by journalists in 2001 revealed that Condit provided the wrong birth date for his marriage license. At the time, Oklahoma required males under age 21 to have parental consent to marry; by claiming to have been born in 1942 rather than 1948, Condit appeared to be older than 18.

In 1967, Condit's father became pastor of a Baptist church in Ceres, California, near Modesto, causing his family to relocate there. Condit began attendance at Modesto Junior College and received an Associate of Arts degree in 1970. In 1972, he received a B.A. degree from California State University, Stanislaus.

While attending college and at the start of his career, Condit worked at a variety of jobs, including one at a tomato cannery, one at a factory that made munitions during the Vietnam War, and in the paint department of a Montgomery Ward department store.

Political career 
Condit began his career on the Ceres city council from 1972 to 1976—the last two years as mayor. He became the youngest mayor in the city's history at the age of 25. Condit served on the Stanislaus County Board of Supervisors from 1976 to 1982, and was elected to the California State Assembly in 1982.

California State Assembly 
In 1988, Condit was a member of the "Gang of Five"with Charles M. Calderon of Whittier, Gerald R. Eaves of Rialto, Rusty Areias of Los Banos and Steve Peace of Chula Vistathat failed to unseat Willie Brown as Speaker of the State Assembly by making a deal with Republicans. Peace co-wrote and produced the 1988 film Return of the Killer Tomatoes, in which Condit appeared in an uncredited, nonspeaking cameo during a fight sequence.

U.S. House of Representatives 
Condit was elected to Congress in 1989 in a special election after the resignation of House Democratic Whip Tony Coelho. He was elected to a full term in 1990, and reelected five more times without serious difficulty (Condit had no Republican challenger during the general elections of 1992 and 1998). His most important committee assignment was as a senior member on the House Intelligence Committee in the months and years prior to the September 11 attacks. Like most Democrats from the Central Valley, Condit was somewhat more conservative than other Democrats from California. Being a Blue Dog Democrat, Condit voted against President Bill Clinton more frequently than other members of his party in the chamber. Despite this Condit took several populist progressive positions such as opposing NAFTA despite intense lobbying from his own district's wine industry and President Clinton himself, voted against the landmark repeal of Glass-Steagall protections, and against the Iraq War and intervention in Kosovo. In the aftermath of Kosovo, Condit was a persistent force in compelling the prosecution of Slobodan Miloševic.

In 1998, during the Monica Lewinsky scandal, Condit publicly demanded that Clinton "come clean" on his relationship with the young woman; a video of this demand was aired almost daily during Condit's own scandal involving a relationship with Bureau of Prisons intern Chandra Levy. Following the September 11, 2001 attacks, interest in the Levy case declined. Condit kept his seat on the Intelligence Committee, retained his security clearance, and was one of a small number of members of Congress who were cleared to see the most sensitive information on the 9/11 attacks.

On December 7, 2001, Condit announced he would run for re-election. He lost the Democratic primary election in March 2002 to his former aide, then-Assemblyman Dennis Cardoza, and left Congress at the end of his term in January 2003. Condit's most notable vote in his last months in office was the resolution to expel Congressman James Traficant after his conviction on corruption charges. In the 420–1 vote on July 24, 2002, Condit was the sole "nay".

Levy scandal

In 2001, Condit became the subject of national news coverage after the disappearance of Chandra Levy, a young woman working as a Washington, D.C. intern, originally from Condit's district. Police questioned Condit twice, and both times he denied having an extramarital affair with her; however, Levy's aunt eventually went public with conversations she had with her about their relationship. Police questioned Condit a third time, and he confessed to the affair. When the affair began, Condit was 53 and Levy was 23.

While Condit was not named as an official suspect in the disappearance, Levy's family suspected that he was withholding important information. His reputation suffered from the contrast between his "pro-family" politics, his adultery with a woman younger than his daughter, and his attempts to mislead the police regarding his affair. In July, two months after Levy vanished, Condit agreed to let investigators search his apartment; hours before the search, police said he was spotted throwing a gift box he had received from another woman into a dumpster in a Washington suburb. This followed news reports that Condit had had an affair with a flight attendant.

Levy's remains were not found during the extensive search that followed her disappearance, but were discovered accidentally May 22, 2002, in a secluded area of Rock Creek Park in Washington D.C.; the death was declared a homicide.

In late 2002, Condit sued writer Dominick Dunne of Vanity Fair for $11 million, claiming that Dunne defamed him by suggesting he ordered Levy killed in 2001. Condit's attorney said that the libel lawsuit was based on comments Dunne repeated on national radio and television programs in December 2001, where he suggested Condit frequented Middle Eastern embassies for sexual activity with prostitutes and that, during those times, he made it clear that he wanted someone to get rid of Levy. Condit's attorney said that Dunne's comments "conveyed that Gary Condit was involved in her kidnapping and in her murder, that friends of Gary Condit had her kidnapped, put in an airplane and dropped in the Atlantic Ocean." Dunne paid an undisclosed amount to settle that lawsuit in March 2005. Dunne said he had been "completely hoodwinked" by an unreliable informant. Subsequently, Condit sued Dunne again, charging him with "revivifying" the slander in an appearance on CNN's Larry King Live in November 2005. In July 2008 a federal judge dismissed the second lawsuit filed against Dunne.

In July 2006, Condit sued the Sonoran News, a free weekly newspaper, for defamation of character after the publication wrote "that Condit was the 'main focus in the Chandra Levy case in 2001, after lying to investigators about his affair with Levy.'" The case was dismissed in July 2007 when the judge ruled that Condit had not proved the statement was false, or that the paper had published it with malice. Years later, Condit publicly denied ever having an affair with Chandra Levy.

Police continued the murder investigation, and in March 2009, a warrant was issued for the arrest of Ingmar Guandique, an undocumented immigrant from El Salvador who had already been convicted and imprisoned for two other attacks on women in Rock Creek Park. He was subsequently indicted for Levy's murder. On November 22, 2010, Guandique was found guilty of first-degree murder, and was sentenced in February 2011 to 60 years in prison. Condit's lawyer Bert Fields said, "It's a complete vindication but that comes a little late. Who gives him his career back?"

However, on June 4, 2015, D.C. Superior Court Judge Gerald Fisher granted a motion for the retrial of Guandique after it was revealed that the sole witness against him, a jailhouse informant named Armando Morales, had lied about prior jailhouse testimony. Prosecutors dropped all charges against Guandique on July 28, 2016, after an associate of Morales came forward with secret recordings in which he admitted to falsifying testimony about the murder of Levy. Levy's death therefore remains unsolved.

Business career 
After his departure from office, Condit moved to Arizona and operated two Baskin-Robbins ice cream stores with his wife and son. When the franchise failed, Condit was ordered to pay the company $98,000 in a breach of contract proceeding. In 2012, he was reported to be serving as president of the Phoenix Institute of Desert Agriculture, which listed its status as 'Dissolved' in the last corporate filing as of June 4, 2015. Condit later returned to California, where he became a registered lobbyist with the J. Blonien law firm of Sacramento.

Family 
In 2012, Condit's son, Chad, announced his intention to run for the House of Representatives as an independent in California's redrawn 10th congressional district. He lost in the top-two election against incumbent Jeff Denham and Democratic challenger Jose Hernandez. In 2015, Condit's grandson Couper was appointed to the Ceres planning commission and was denied reappointment in 2020 by the council. In 2018, Condit's grandson Channce Condit ran unopposed for district one Ceres City Council. In 2020, Condit's nephew Buck was elected to the Stanislaus County Board of Supervisors representing district 1 defeating Modesto City Councilman Bill Zoslocki 58.77% to 41.23%. During the same election cycle, Condit's two grandsons were elected to public office. Ceres City Councilmember Channce Condit joined his second cousin Buck on the Stanislaus County Board of Supervisors representing district 5 after he defeated Tom Hallinan 60% to 40%. Former member of the Ceres Planning Commission Couper Condit defeated incumbent Michael "Mike" Kline for Ceres City Council 38.19% to 23.52% with two other competitors falling short.

See also

List of federal political sex scandals in the United States

Notes

External links

Condit's Profile on CNN

|-

|-

|-

|-

1948 births
21st-century American politicians
Baptists from Oklahoma
Democratic Party members of the United States House of Representatives from California
Living people
Marshall School of Business alumni
Mayors of places in California
Democratic Party members of the California State Assembly
People from Ceres, California
People from Salina, Oklahoma